James Nasak is an Anglican bishop in Uganda: he has been  Bishop of North Karamoja since 2007.

References

Anglican bishops of North Karamoja
21st-century Anglican bishops in Uganda
Living people
Uganda Christian University alumni
Year of birth missing (living people)